Saswati Chatterjee is a virologist working as a professor at the Los Angeles City of Hope National Medical Center in the research department. Some of the viral areas she researches are: stem cells, gene therapy, genome editing, and parvovirus. Her main and current area of research is using Adeno-Associated Virus Vectors (AAV-Vectors). Additionally, she has had a role in many publications (see publications).

Education and training

Chatterjee received her B.Sc. in Cell & Molecular Biology from McGill University in Montreal, Canada. She continued on at McGill and received her Ph.D. in Immunology.

Research contributions

Adeno-Associated Virus vectors can be used for stem cell gene therapy. Adenovirus' have a Baltimore classification of level I, meaning that they have a liner dsDNA genome within an icosahedral nucleocapsid. Some of their advantages as vectors are that they are considered to be efficient at gene delivery and can infect nondividing cells. Other disadvantages are that adeno-associated viruses are immunogenic, high toxicity and have a small packaging limit.

One of Chatterjee's most notable publications is from 1999, and she researched the use of a "single stranded AAV, replication-defective nonpathogenic human parvovirus with a 4.7kb DNA genome with a palindromic inverted terminal repeats"  This process REQUIRES the use of an adenovirus for the DNA to enter the cell and cause infection, thus being stably integrated into the cells DNA genome in a specific place. This study showed that the AAV vector was successful at efficiently transferring DNA into nondividing cells. Another publication that Chatterjee researched and featured in, regarded the effective transduction of CD34+ cells. They found that AAV transduction gave way to altered viral chromosomal integration.

Awards and honors

Fogarty NIH Visiting Fellowship
Mayo Foundation Fellowship
Medical Research Council Post Doctoral Fellowship
McGill University Faculty of Medicine Graduate Student Award
Arthur W. Ham Graduate Student Award - Canadian Federation of Biological Societies
J.W. McConnell Scholarship in Science & Engineering, McGill University
Member Gene Therapy & Inborn Errors Review Group
Member, Editorial Board, Human Gene Therapy
McGill University Dean's Honors' list

Publications

Chatterjee has made contributions in 38 publications, on many of which she has been the lead researcher and author. Some of her best known publications are listed here.

Li, XJ, Chyu, KY, Dimayuga P, Yano J, Ferreira C, Ji A, Wang L, Cercek B, Chatterjee S, Shah PK. "One single IM injection of recombinant adeno-associated virus encoding ApoA-I-Mllano gene reduces aortic atherosclerosis and modulates the inflammatory phenotype of vein graft lesions in ApoE(-/-) mice" Circulation 2005; 112:U163-U164.

References

Canadian virologists
Year of birth missing (living people)
Living people